The electoral history of Marion Barry:

1971

1974

1976

1978

1982

1986

1990

1992

1994

2004

2008

2012

References

Barry, Marion